The 1998–99 Edmonton Oilers season was the Oilers' 20th season in the NHL, and they were coming off a 35–37–10 record in 1997–98, earning their 2nd straight playoff appearance.

During the off-season, the Oilers franchise remaining in Edmonton looked very unlikely, as Oilers owner Peter Pocklington would be talking to a group from Houston which, if successful in the purchase, would relocate the club to Houston. At the last minute, the Edmonton Investors Group, a consortium of 37 Edmonton-based owners, raised the funds to purchase the team from Pocklington, vowing to keep the Oilers in Edmonton. The Oilers received support throughout the NHL, and the club would remain.

Also during the off-season, the Oilers would lose goaltender Curtis Joseph, as he would leave the team as a free agent and join the Toronto Maple Leafs, leaving the goaltending duties to Bob Essensa and former Mighty Ducks of Anaheim backup Mikhail Shtalenkov, and Edmonton would join the newly created Northwest Division, along with their Western Canada rivals the Calgary Flames and Vancouver Canucks, as well as the Colorado Avalanche.

Edmonton would start the season with a 7–4–0 record in their opening 11 games, and would remain close to the .500 mark until early February, despite losing Doug Weight to injuries. Edmonton would then go into a slump, and would drop out of a playoff spot, and on March 17, the Oilers would be 25–33–10, sitting in ninth place. Three days later, the Oilers would send Mats Lindgren and an eighth-round draft pick to the New York Islanders in exchange for goaltender Tommy Salo.  Edmonton would also deal Boris Mironov and Dean McAmmond to the Chicago Blackhawks for youngsters Ethan Moreau, Christian Laflamme and Chad Kilger, and acquire Jason Smith from the Toronto Maple Leafs for a fourth-round draft pick on March 23.

The moves paid off for the Oilers, as they would post an 8–4–2 record after the Salo deal and sneak into the final playoff position, finishing the season with a 33–37–12 record. On April 3, 1999, Patrick Roy defeated the Edmonton Oilers and passed Glenn Hall with his 408th victory.

Offensively, Bill Guerin would be Edmonton's leader, scoring a team high 30 goals and 34 assists for 64 points.  Josef Beranek would earn 49 points, while Mike Grier would have a breakout season, scoring 20 goals and earning 44 points.  Doug Weight would register 37 points in only 43 games.  Defensively, Boris Mironov would lead blueline with 40 points, but was dealt to Chicago at the trade deadline.  Roman Hamrlik chipped in with 32 points, while Janne Niinimaa would earn 28.  Sean Brown would have a team high 188 penalty minutes in only 51 games.

In goal, Bob Essensa and Mikhail Shtalenkov would split time for a majority of the season, each earning 12 victories.  Shtalenkov would then be traded to the Phoenix Coyotes, and the Oilers would acquire Tommy Salo to become the new starter, and in 13 games, Salo would go 8–2–2 with a 2.31 goals against average (GAA).

The Oilers lead the NHL in power-play opportunities, with 438.

The Oilers opened the playoffs against the Presidents' Trophy-winning Dallas Stars, who had finished the year with 114 points, 36 higher than the Oilers. Edmonton found themselves down in the series 2–0 after dropping two close games in Dallas. The Stars quickly eliminated the Oilers, winning the next two games in Edmonton by 3–2 scores to sweep the series. The Stars continued on to win the Stanley Cup.

Season standings

Schedule and results

Playoffs

Season stats

Scoring leaders

Goaltending

Playoff stats

Scoring leaders

Goaltending

Awards and records

Awards

Milestones

Transactions

Trades

Free agents

Draft picks
Edmonton's draft picks at the 1998 NHL Entry Draft

References
 
 
 
 
Notes
 SHRP Sports
 The Internet Hockey Database
 National Hockey League Guide & Record Book 2007

Edmonton Oilers seasons, 1998-99
Edmon
Edmonton Oilers seasons